Dipaenae moesta is a moth of the subfamily Arctiinae.

References

Lithosiini